The Nishtar Park (formerly known as Patel Park)  is located at Parsi Colony, off M.A. Jinnah Road in the area of Soldier Bazaar, Karachi, Sindh, Pakistan.

History
Nishtar Park was originally called Patel Park, named after Congress leader Vallabhbhai Patel. It was then renamed after Sardar Abdur Rab Nishtar, one of the main leaders of Pakistan Movement, in 1965. The biggest gathering of Shia Muslims also takes place in Muharram as well as most other religious and political gatherings.

During the largest gathering of Shia Muslims in Karachi in the month of Muharram prominent Shia scholars such as Allama Rasheed Turabi and Allama Talib Jauhari used to address the majlis for many years until their death. Nowadays, Allama Syed Shehanshah Hussain Naqvi addresses this great majlis.

On 11 April 2006, at least 50 people were killed, and more than 100 injured, when a bomb exploded at Nishtar Park. (See also: Nishtar Park bombing).

Formerly, it was home ground of Rangers Cricket Club and Jang Cricket Club.

See also
List of parks in Karachi
 List of parks and gardens in Pakistan
 List of parks and gardens in Lahore
 List of parks and gardens in Karachi
Nishtar Park bombing

References

Parks in Karachi
Cricket grounds in Pakistan